The Pride of Bear Creek is a collection of Western short stories by Robert E. Howard.  It was first published in 1966 by Donald M. Grant, Publisher, Inc.  Grant also published an edition in 1977 with illustrations by Tim Kirk.

Contents
 "The Riot at Cougar Paw"
 "Pilgrims to the Pecos"
 "High Horse Rampage"
 "The Apache Mountain War"
 "Pistol Polities"
 "The Conquerin' Hero of the Humbolts"
 "A Ringtailed Tornado"

References

1966 short story collections
Short story collections by Robert E. Howard
Western (genre) short stories
Donald M. Grant, Publisher books